Stanisław Zygmunt Kowal (2 May 1928 – 28 November 2001) was a Polish athlete. He competed in the men's triple jump at the 1952 Summer Olympics. Kowal graduated from economics at the Warsaw School of Economics, and worked many year in international trade. For his athletics achievements, he was awarded the Silver Cross of Merit.

References

1928 births
2001 deaths
Athletes (track and field) at the 1952 Summer Olympics
Polish male triple jumpers
Olympic athletes of Poland
Sportspeople from Kielce
Polish economists
Burials at Bródno Cemetery
SGH Warsaw School of Economics alumni